Vacation is a 2005 Indian Malayalam-language film, directed by K. K. Haridas and produced by A. J. Shahar. The film stars Amitha, Harishree Ashokan, Indrans and Lalu Alex in lead roles. The film had musical score by Dr G. Santhosh and Kaithapram Vishwanathan Nambudiri.

Cast
Amitha 
Harishree Ashokan 
Indrans 
Lalu Alex as Martin 
Prem Kishore 
Suhasini as Celine 
Vijayaraghavan
Cochin Haneefa 
 Kaviraj

Soundtrack
The music was composed by Dr G. Santhosh and Kaithapram Vishwanathan Nambudiri.

References

External links
 

2005 films
2000s Malayalam-language films
Films directed by K. K. Haridas